The Handler is a crime series created by Canadian writer-producer Chris Haddock, airing in the United States on CBS in the 2003-04 season.  The show starred Joe Pantoliano as Joe Renato, an FBI agent assigned to train and handle (hence the title) young undercover officers in the FBI.  Other cast members included Hill Harper, Anna Belknap, Lola Glaudini, and Tanya Wright.

Belknap and Harper would reunite as co-stars on the drama CSI: New York beginning in 2005.

Cast
 Joe Pantoliano as Joe Renato
 Hill Harper as Darnell
 Anna Belknap as Lily
 Lola Glaudini as Heather
 Tanya Wright as Marcy

Episode list

References

External links
 

CBS original programming
2003 American television series debuts
2004 American television series endings
Television series by CBS Studios
Television shows set in Los Angeles